is a Japanese actor, voice actor and narrator from the Tokyo Metropolitan area. He is attached to Mausu Promotion.

The astringent and calm quality of his deep voice has landed him many roles in films, dubbing, animation, and video games. He is most known for the roles of second generation Jigen Daisuke (Lupin III franchise), Black Jack (Black Jack), Solid Snake, Naked Snake, Solidus Snake and Venom Snake (Metal Gear games),  Gamigami Devil (Popolocrois), Ryoma Hoshi (Danganronpa V3: Killing Harmony), Shunsui Kyouraku (Bleach), Lieutenant Garuru (Sgt. Frog), Gwendel von Voltaire (Kyo Kara Maoh!), Batou (Ghost in the Shell series and movies), Blackbeard/Marshall D. Teach (One Piece), Tadakatsu Honda (Samurai Warriors and Warriors Orochi series), twin police inspectors Sango and Jugo Yokomizo (Detective Conan), Bryan Hawk (Hajime no Ippo), All For One (My Hero Academia), Thorkell (Vinland Saga), Wamuu (JoJo's Bizarre Adventure), Anavel Gato (Mobile Suit Gundam 0083: Stardust Memory) and the various incarnations of Xehanort (Kingdom Hearts series). Apart from voicing villainous or jokester characters, he also occasionally does narration for anime shows. He is the son of the late voice actor Chikao Ohtsuka.

He is also the famous official dubbing roles for many western actors such as Steven Seagal, Nicolas Cage, Antonio Banderas, Dolph Lundgren, Samuel L. Jackson, Denzel Washington, Dennis Quaid and many more.

On January 7, 2017, he was married, according to Mausu Promotion.

Filmography

Television animation

OVA

ONA

Cinematic animation

Live-action films

Live-action television

Tokusatsu

Video games

Drama CD
 Dengeki Bunko Best Game Selection7 Fire Emblem Tabidati no syou (????) (Hardin)
 Fire Emblem Shiranhen/Soumeihen (????) (King of Talys)
 Jojo's Bizarre Adventure (????) (Mohammed Avdol)
 Drama CD Metal Gear Solid (????) (Solid Snake)
 Sdatcher (????) (Jean-Jack Gibson)

Dubbing roles

Voice-double

Live-action

Animation

Other
 Bionicle (Tahu, Lhikan)
 Mega64 (Konami Janitor (Rocco Botte))
 VR Troopers (Grimlord/Karl Ziktor) (Gardner Baldwin)

Awards

References

External links
 Official agency profile 
 
 
 

1959 births
Living people
Japanese male video game actors
Japanese male voice actors
Japanese male musical theatre actors
Male voice actors from Tokyo
Mausu Promotion voice actors
Seiyu Award winners
20th-century Japanese male actors
21st-century Japanese male actors